Richie Joseph Barker (23 November 1939 – 11 October 2020) was an English footballer and manager who played in the Football League for Derby County, Notts County and Peterborough United. He was also manager of Shrewsbury Town, Stoke City, Notts County, Ethnikos Piraeus (Greece), Zamalek (Egypt) and West Bromwich Albion.

Playing career
Barker was born in Loughborough and began his career with non-league Burton Albion in 1960. In the summer of 1965 he played abroad in the Eastern Canada Professional Soccer League with Hamilton Primos. He spent seven years with the "Brewers" and scored a club record 159 goals before joining Derby County in 1967 as one of Brian Clough's first signings. He played 31 times in 1967–68 scoring 12 goals and after scoring just twice in 14 in 1968–69 he was sold to Notts County in December 1968. He enjoyed a far more successful career with the "Magpies" scoring 20 goals in 1969–70 and 13 in 1970–71 helping Jimmy Sirrel's side win the Fourth Division title. After falling out of favour at Meadow Lane he ended his playing career with a season at Peterborough United before moving into coaching.

Managerial career
Barker began his coaching career with Shrewsbury Town working alongside Alan Durban and once Durban left for Stoke City in February 1978 Barker took over as manager of the "Shrews". He remained at Shrewsbury for nine months before taking up the position of assistant manager to John Barnwell at Wolverhampton Wanderers and helped Wolves to lift the League Cup in 1980. In the summer of 1981 Stoke manager Alan Durban left for Sunderland and he recommended Barker for the job and the Stoke board duly went with his advice and appointed Barker. His time at Stoke got off to a great start as Stoke beat Arsenal on the opening day of the 1981–82 season. However it was a tough season for Stoke as they battled against relegation finishing just two places above the drop zone. The 1982–83 season saw Barker bring in some quality players such as George Berry, Mickey Thomas, Sammy McIlroy and Mark Chamberlain as Stoke enjoyed a good season with a number of exciting matches. However, in the summer of 1983 Barker decided to change his tactics to be a more direct team using the long ball style of play. It did not go down well with supporters or indeed players and results were not good and Barker was sacked in December 1983.

He spent a year out of the game before making a return to former club Notts County and then managed Greek side Ethnikos Piraeus and Egyptian giants Zamalek with whom he helped win the African Cup of Champions Clubs in 1986. He returned to England and became assistant manager at Sheffield Wednesday and later helped his former player Paul Bracewell at Halifax Town.

In addition, he served West Bromwich Albion as chief scout (taking over as caretaker manager for one game following the departure of Ray Harford).

Career statistics

Playing career
Source:

Managerial career

Honours

Player
Notts County
Football League Fourth Division: 1970–71

Manager
Zamalek
African Cup of Champions Clubs: 1986

Death
Barker died on 11 October 2020, at the age of 80.

References

External links
 
 Interview with Ritchie Barker at wolvesheroes.com

1939 births
2020 deaths
Sportspeople from Loughborough
Footballers from Leicestershire
English footballers
English football managers
Burton Albion F.C. players
Loughborough United F.C. players
Matlock Town F.C. players
Hamilton Steelers (ECPSL) players
Derby County F.C. players
Notts County F.C. players
Peterborough United F.C. players
Shrewsbury Town F.C. managers
Stoke City F.C. managers
Notts County F.C. managers
West Bromwich Albion F.C. managers
Sheffield Wednesday F.C. managers
English Football League managers
Zamalek SC managers
Ethnikos Piraeus F.C. managers
Association football forwards
Eastern Canada Professional Soccer League players